The 1976–77 QMJHL season was the eighth season in the history of the Quebec Major Junior Hockey League. The league renamed its divisions in honour of Robert Lebel and Frank Dilio, two lifetime contributors to ice hockey in Quebec. The East Division became the "Dilio Division" and the West Division became the "Lebel Division." Ten teams played 72 games each in the schedule. The Quebec Remparts finished first overall in the regular season to capture the Jean Rougeau Trophy. The Sherbrooke Castors won the President's Cup defeating the Quebec Remparts in the finals.

Team changes
 The Hull Festivals were renamed the Hull Olympiques.

Final standings
Note: GP = Games played; W = Wins; L = Losses; T = Ties; PTS = Points; GF = Goals for; GA = Goals against

complete list of standings.

Scoring leaders
Note: GP = Games played; G = Goals; A = Assists; Pts = Points; PIM = Penalties in minutes

 complete scoring statistics

Playoffs
Ron Carter was the leading scorer of the playoffs with 30 points (12 goals, 18 assists).

Quarterfinals
 Quebec Remparts defeated Hull Olympiques 4 games to 0,.
 Montreal Juniors defeated Chicoutimi Saguenéens 4 games to 3, 1 tie.
 Sherbrooke Castors defeated Laval National 4 games to 3.
 Cornwall Royals defeated Trois-Rivières Draveurs 4 games to 2.

Semifinals
 Quebec Remparts defeated Montreal Juniors 4 games to 0, 1 tie.
 Sherbrooke Castors defeated Cornwall Royals 4 games to 1, 1 tie.

Finals
 Sherbrooke Castors defeated Quebec Remparts 4 games to 1.

All-star teams
First team
 Goaltender - Tim Bernhardt, Cornwall Royals 
 Left defence - Robert Picard, Montreal Juniors
 Right defence - Graeme Nicolson, Cornwall Royals
 Left winger - Jere Gillis, Sherbrooke Castors
 Centreman - Jean Savard, Quebec Remparts
 Right winger - Lucien Deblois, Sorel Éperviers 
 Coach - Yvan Gingras, Chicoutimi Saguenéens
Second team
 Goaltender - Jean Belisle, Chicoutimi Saguenéens 
 Left defence - Alain Myette, Shawinigan Dynamos
 Right defence - Mario Marois, Quebec Remparts 
 Left winger - Normand Dupont, Montreal Juniors 
 Centreman - Sylvain Locas, Chicoutimi Saguenéens
 Right winger - Mike Bossy, Laval National
 Coach - Michel Bergeron, Trois-Rivières Draveurs
 List of First/Second/Rookie team all-stars.

Trophies and awards
Team
President's Cup - Playoff Champions, Sherbrooke Castors
Jean Rougeau Trophy - Regular Season Champions, Quebec Remparts

Player
Michel Brière Memorial Trophy - Most Valuable Player, Lucien Deblois, Sorel Éperviers
Jean Béliveau Trophy - Top Scorer, Jean Savard, Quebec Remparts
Jacques Plante Memorial Trophy - Best GAA, Tim Bernhardt, Cornwall Royals
Emile Bouchard Trophy - Defenceman of the Year, Robert Picard, Montreal Juniors
Michel Bergeron Trophy - Rookie of the Year, Rick Vaive, Sherbrooke Castors
Frank J. Selke Memorial Trophy - Most sportsmanlike player, Mike Bossy, Laval National Juniors

See also
1977 Memorial Cup
1977 NHL Entry Draft
1976–77 OMJHL season
1976–77 WCHL season

References
 Official QMJHL Website
 www.hockeydb.com/

QMJHL
Quebec Major Junior Hockey League seasons